Phipson is an English surname. People with the surname Phipson include:

 Herbert Musgrave Phipson (1850–1936), a British wine merchant and naturalist, secretary of the Bombay Natural History Society.
 Joan Margaret Phipson (1912–2003), an award-winning Australian children's writer. 
 Richard Makilwaine Phipson (1827–1884), an English diocesan architect for the Anglican Diocese of Norwich.

English-language surnames
Surnames of English origin